Eladio Dieste (December 1, 1917 – July 29, 2000) was a Uruguayan engineer  who made his reputation by building a range of structures from grain silos, factory sheds, markets and churches, most of them in Uruguay and all of exceptional elegance.

Biography 
Dieste was born in Artigas department.  His uncle was the Spanish poet Rafael Dieste.

A particular innovation was his Gaussian vault, a thin-shell structure for roofs in single-thickness brick, that derives its stiffness and strength from a double curvature catenary arch form that resists buckling failure.

There were several architects and engineers in South and Latin America who were working in the modernist language, such as Guillermo Gonzalez Zuleta in Colombia, Carlos Raúl Villanueva in Venezuela and Félix Candela in Mexico, who brought architecture and structural engineering into close proximity, especially when undertaking humble commissions. His buildings were mostly roofed with thin shell vaults constructed of brick and ceramic tiles. These forms were cheaper than reinforced concrete, and didn't require ribs and beams. In developing this approach, even in comparison with modernists the world over, he was an innovator.

Dieste is quoted about his use of materials and structure:

There are deep moral/practical reasons for our search which give form to our work: with the form we create we can adjust to the laws of matter with all reverence, forming a dialogue with reality and its mysteries in essential communion... For architecture to be truly constructed, the materials must be used with profound respect for their essence and possibilities; only thus can 'cosmic economy' be achieved... in agreement with the profound order of the world; only then can have that authority that so astounds us in the great works of the past.

With regard to structure Dieste stated:

The resistant virtues of the structure that we make depend on their form; it is through their form that they are stable and not because of an awkward accumulation of materials. There is nothing more noble and elegant from an intellectual viewpoint than this; resistance through form.

Many of the techniques that he developed to achieve these forms, such as pre-stressing of brickwork and moveable formworks, were in advance of contemporary techniques in the developed world.

He died, aged 82, in Montevideo.

Selected works 
 St. Peter Church in Durazno
 Christ the Worker Church in Estación Atlántida
 Church of Our Lady of Lourdes in Malvín
 St. John of Avila Church in Alcalá de Henares
 Teatro de Verano Ramón Collazo in Montevideo
 Montevideo Shopping (structure of the first stage, 1985; architect: Guillermo Gómez Platero)
 Church of St. Charles Borromeo (structural calculation, 1956; architect: Juan Pablo Terra)

References

Sources 
  |
 
 
 Fausto Giovannardi  "Eladio Dieste: un'ingegneria magica", Fausto Giovannardi. Borgo San Lorenzo, 2007.

External links 
 Article in Architecture Week
 
 Structurae: Eladio Dieste

1917 births
2000 deaths
Uruguayan civil engineers
University of the Republic (Uruguay) alumni
Modernist architects
Ecclesiastical architects
People from Artigas Department
Uruguayan people of German descent
20th-century Uruguayan architects
20th-century Uruguayan engineers